Desulfovibrio magneticus is a bacterium. It is sulfate-reducing and is notable for producing intracellular single-domain-sized magnetite particles, making it magnetotactic. Its type strain is RS-1T (=ATCC 700980T =DSM 13731T).

D. magneticus is particularly noted for its anisotropic, bullet-shaped magnetosomes, unusual amongst magnetotactic bacteria.

References

Further reading
Staley, James T., et al. "Bergey's manual of systematic bacteriology, vol. 3."Williams and Wilkins, Baltimore, MD (1989): 2250–2251.
Bélaich, Jean-Pierre, Mireille Bruschi, and Jean-Louis Garcia, eds. Microbiology and biochemistry of strict Anaerobes Involved in interspecies hydrogen transfer. No. 54. Springer, 1990.

Schuler, Dirk, ed. Magnetoreception and magnetosomes in bacteria. Vol. 3. Springer, 2007.

External links 
LPSN

Type strain of Desulfovibrio magneticus at BacDive -  the Bacterial Diversity Metadatabase

Bacteria described in 2002
Desulfovibrio